NRG may refer to:

Music 
 Several electronic music genres, including:
 Hi-NRG, an early evolution of new-style disco
 Hard NRG, a hard form of dance music
 Euro-NRG, another name for Eurodance
 DJ NRG, an alias of Eurobeat artist Ken Laszlo (Gianni Coraini)
 NRG (South Korean band)
 "N-R-G" (Adamski song), 1990

Organisations 
 Nieuw Republikeins Genootschap, a Dutch republican society
 NRG Energy, an energy company
 NRG Park, Houston, Texas, US
NRG Stadium
 NRG station, Philadelphia, Pennsylvania, US
 NRG Engineering, Singapore
 NRG360 formerly NRG was an Israeli newspaper online outlet of Makor Rishon (formerly, a newspaper online outlet of Maariv)* NRG Networks, UK
 NRG Recording Studios in North Hollywood, US
 Nuclear Research and Consultancy Group, Netherlands
 NRG Esports, US
 Gestetner Group, later NRG Group
 , a Norwegian private school
Northern Research Group, a group of MPs within the UK Conservative Party

Biochemistry 
Neuregulins:
 Neuregulin 1 or NRG1
 Neuregulin 2 or NRG2
 Neuregulin 3 or NRG3
 Neuregulin 4 or NRG4
Psychoactive compounds:
Naphyrone (NRG-1)
4-MEC (NRG-2)
Pentylone (NRG-3)
RCS-4 (NRG-4)
5-IAI (NRG-5)

Other 
NRG (file format) used by Nero Burning ROM
Numerical Renormalization Group, a numerical technique to solve certain many-body problems where quantum impurity physics plays a key role.
New River Gorge

See also 
 Energy (disambiguation)
 NRJ (disambiguation)
 NAG (disambiguation)